Lambton was a federal electoral district represented in the House of Commons of Canada from 1867 to 1882. It was located in the province of Ontario. It was created by the British North America Act of 1867.

The County of Lambton consisted of the Townships of Bosanquet, Warwick, Plympton, Sarnia, Moore, Enniskillen, and Brooke, and the Town of Sarnia.

The electoral district was abolished in 1882 when it was redistributed between Lambton East and Lambton West ridings.

It was represented for those 15 years of operation by Alexander Mackenzie, of the Liberal Party of Canada.

Election results

See also 

 List of Canadian federal electoral districts
 Past Canadian electoral districts

External links 
 Riding history from the Library of Parliament

Former federal electoral districts of Ontario